Zavardasht (also Romanized as Zavārdasht and Zavār Dasht) is a village in Moallem Kalayeh Rural District, Rudbar-e Alamut District, Qazvin County, Qazvin Province, Iran. At the 2006 census, its population was 185, in 69 families.

References 

Populated places in Qazvin County